Maria Vamvakinou (born 4 January 1959) is an Australian politician. She is a member of the Australian Labor Party (ALP) and has served in the House of Representatives since the 2001 federal election, representing the Division of Calwell in Victoria.

Early life
Vamvakinou was born in Lefkada, Greece, an island in the Ionian Sea. She arrived in Australia    with her family in 1963 at the age of four, settling in Melbourne. She renounced her Greek citizenship in 2000 prior to standing for parliament. Vamvakinou was educated at public schools in Carlton and Brunswick before going on to attend Princes Hill High School.

Vamvakinou completed a Bachelor of Arts in Modern Greek and political science at the University of Melbourne. She went on to complete a diploma in education and worked as a high school teacher from 1982 to 1987, teaching Greek.

Politics
Vamvakinou held office in the Australian Labor Party (Victorian Branch) and worked as a political staffer for a number of years before entering parliament herself. She worked as an electorate officer to Andrew Theophanous (1988, 1990), executive assistant to Joan Kirner (1989), personal secretary to Andrew McCutcheon (1991), and electorate officer to Senator Kim Carr (1993–2001). She also served on the Northcote City Council from 1990 to 1992.

Parliament
Vamvakinou was elected to parliament at the 2001 federal election, regaining the Division of Calwell for the ALP against the incumbent MP Andrew Theophanous, who had resigned from the party in 2000 to sit as an independent. She is the first woman born in Greece to serve in federal parliament. She has been re-elected on seven further occasions, most recently at the 2022 federal election.

Vamvakinou has served on numerous House and joint committees during her time in parliament, including as chair of the House Standing Committee on Industry, Science and Innovation from 2008 to 2010. She has also served on the Speaker's panel from 2010 to 2013 and again from 2016. She is a member of the ALP's Socialist Left faction.

Personal life
Vamvakinou is married to Dr Michalis S. Michael, and has two children.  she lived in Northcote, which lies outside her electorate.

References

External links
Personal website

1959 births
Living people
Australian Labor Party members of the Parliament of Australia
Members of the Australian House of Representatives
Members of the Australian House of Representatives for Calwell
Greek emigrants to Australia
People who lost Greek citizenship
Naturalised citizens of Australia
Women members of the Australian House of Representatives
People from Lefkada
Labor Left politicians
21st-century Australian politicians
21st-century Australian women politicians
People from Northcote, Victoria
Politicians from Melbourne
University of Melbourne alumni